Creswell Bay is an Arctic waterway in Qikiqtaaluk Region, Nunavut, Canada. It is an arm of western Prince Regent Inlet in eastern Somerset Island.

While the bay does not have any permanent settlements, it remains an important Inuit habitation site.

Geography
Creswell Bay is large and almost semicircular. Its habitat is characterized by
tundra, rivers, streams, mud, saline sand flats, a freshwater lake, open sea, inlets, coastal marine features, coastal cliffs, and rocky marine shores.

Stanwell-Fletcher Lake is joined to the bay by the Union River; crystalline rocks are notable along the way. The Creswell River also empties into the bay.

The Devonian Peel Sound Formation outcrops at the bay. The formation consists of sandstone, grit, and conglomerate which is predominantly limestone.

Fauna

The bay is a Canadian Important Bird Area (#NU062). Notable bird species include grey plover, greater snow goose, king eider, long-tailed duck, red phalarope, sanderling, and white-rumped sandpiper. Arctic char enter the bay in the late summer and swim up the Union River to Stanwell-Fletcher Lake, where they over-winter. The large numbers of char attract beluga whales and narwhals which feed on the char.

History
Archeological sites include Thule encampments and Dorset settlements.

References

Bays of Qikiqtaaluk Region
Important Bird Areas of Qikiqtaaluk Region
Important Bird Areas of Arctic islands